Breay is a surname. Notable people with the surname include:

Claire Breay (born 1968), English writer, medieval historian, and curator
Lara Breay, British film producer